The Nome Nugget is a weekly newspaper published on Thursdays in Nome, Alaska, United States and serves the entire Northwest region of Alaska. Additionally, it is printed in Anchorage, Alaska for newsstands and airports. It was awarded best weekly newspaper in all of Alaska in 2012 by the Alaska Press Club, and the Nugget's reporters have won dozens of awards and accolades for their work in recent years. It is an independent newspaper which is currently owned by the Nugget Publishing Corp., owned by Diana Haecker and Nils Hahn. The Nome Nugget is Alaska's oldest newspaper.

Origins of the Nome Nugget
While the Nome Nugget may be accepted as the oldest newspaper in Alaska, exactly how old it is has been in dispute. While the newspaper officially claims that it was established in 1897, the Library of Congress cites it as being established in 1900, and other Alaska-based organizations claim it is from 1938.

According to the Alaska State Library the first newspaper in Nome was the Nome News, established in 1899, In 1900 the name was changed the Nome Daily News and then back to the Nome News by 1904. In 1903, the publishing company at the time, Nome News Pub. Co., produced a supplemental newspaper entitled the Hell Whooper. It only ran for one issue on April 17. The name changed again in 1906 to the Nome Daily Nugget under a similarly named but different owner, Nome Pub. Co. In 1918 it was changed to the Nome Tri-Weekly Nugget, in 1919 it was changed to the Nome Nugget, and in 1934 back to the Nome Daily Nugget. In 1938 the paper's name changed for the final time back to the Nome Nugget.

In 1982 former editor Nancy McGuire purchased the Nome Nugget from Nome Pub. Co. and named her company the Nugget Publishing Corporation. Following McGuire's death in 2016, the Nugget Publishing Corporation was handled by her estate during purchase negotiations. Current owners Diana Haecker and Nils Hahn have been a part of the Nugget for over a decade, and also manage Mushing Magazine, a sled dog and mushing themed publication.

Distribution
The Nome Nugget produces approximately 6,000 papers per issue and reaches a total of 24,000 readers just from the paper copies. Additionally, the Nome Nugget is delivered to every state in the United States via subscriptions. The Nome Nugget is the primary news source for news in the city of Nome and in the 15 surrounding communities in the Northwest region of Alaska. This includes Barrow, Point Hope, Kotzebue, and the NANA region. According to the newspaper, “Nome is the logistical and economical hub for the surrounding 15 Bering Strait and Norton Sound communities that are off the road system.” It is the only news outlet with reach to nearly every village in the region. They include Little Diomede, Shishmaref, Wales, Brevig Mission, Teller, Solomon, Council, White Mountain, Golovin, Elim, Koyuk, Shaktoolik, Unalakleet, St. Michaels, and Stebbins.

The online version of the newspaper is read by over 4,000 online users.

Universal Pictures lawsuit
'The Fourth Kind, a 2009 science fiction/horror film starring Milla Jovovich was set in Nome, and to promote the film, Universal Pictures created a website with fake news stories supposedly taken from real Alaskan newspapers, including the Nugget and the Fairbanks Daily News-Miner''. The newspapers sued Universal, eventually reaching a settlement where Universal would remove the fake stories and pay $20,000 to the Alaska Press Club and a $2,500 contribution to a scholarship fund for the Calista Corporation.

References

External links
 

1900 establishments in Alaska
Newspapers published in Alaska
Nome, Alaska
Newspapers established in 1900